Back To Front TV is a British television production company based in London, United Kingdom started in 2013 by Haider Mannan. It aims to develop entertainment properties for a variety of genres, mainly specialising in docu-reality programmes.

Recent Projects 
In 2013 Back To Front TV started development on a new reality show, working title Back to Front, focusing on fashion and style photography.

Notes 

Television production companies of the United Kingdom